Oleksandr Tkachenko may refer to:

 Oleksandr Tkachenko (politician) (born 1939), Ukrainian politician
 Oleksandr Tkachenko (footballer, born 1947), Soviet international footballer
 Oleksandr Tkachenko (footballer, born 1993), Ukrainian football goalkeeper
 Oleksandr Tkachenko (rower) (1960–2015), Soviet Olympic rower
 Oleksandr Tkachenko (journalist) (born 1966), Ukrainian journalist
 Aleksandr Tkachenko (poet), Russian footballer and poet, see Novaya Yunost
 Aleksandr Tkachenko (boxer) (born 1955), Soviet Olympic boxer
 Aleksandr Tkachenko (skier) (born 1971), Belarusian Olympic skier

See also
 Tkachenko